Joachim Mrugowsky (15 August 1905 – 2 June 1948) was a German bacteriologist who conducted experiments on humans at the Sachsenhausen concentration camp. He was Associate Professor, Medical Doctorate, Chief of Hygiene Institute of the Waffen-SS, Senior Hygienist at the Reich, SS-Physician, SS and Waffen-SS Colonel. He was found guilty of war crimes following the war in the Doctors' Trial and executed in 1948.

Early life and education
Mrugowsky) was born to a family of Polish origin; his father was a medical doctor. In 1925, Mrugowsky began his studies of natural sciences and medicine at the University of Halle. He completed the studies in 1930-1931 with a medical doctorate and a doctorate of natural sciences. 1930-1931 he was the Hochschulgruppenführer (University group leader) of the National Socialist German Students' League branch at the University of Halle. After a two-year internship, he became an assistant at the Hygiene Institute of the University of Halle. Mrugowsky was made an associate professor in the area of hygiene at the University of Berlin in September 1944.

Career in Nazi Germany
Since 1930, Mrugowsky had been involved in the Nazi ideology, first being the group leader of a local National Socialist German Students' Association then the NSDAP party member (No. 210,049). In 1931, he joined the SS, where he achieved the rank of Oberführer in both the General SS and the Waffen-SS. Mrugowsky coordinated human experimentation at the Sachsenhausen concentration camp near Berlin. This included testing of typhus vaccines, biological warfare agents, including poisoned bullets and lethal injections.

Trial and conviction
He was implicated in the Nazi human experimentation program, with the exception of the aviation experiments, which were conducted on concentration camp prisoners. Mrugowsky was convicted of various charges in the Doctors' trial and sentenced to death in August 1947. He was executed on 2 June 1948.

References

1905 births
1948 deaths
Holocaust perpetrators in Germany
People from Rathenow
German people convicted of crimes against humanity
German people of Polish descent
People from the Province of Brandenburg
Nazi Party politicians
Executions by the United States Nuremberg Military Tribunals
Physicians in the Nazi Party
Executed people from Brandenburg
Nazi human subject research
SS-Oberführer
Waffen-SS personnel
Academic staff of the Humboldt University of Berlin
Sachsenhausen concentration camp personnel
Executed mass murderers